Rhododendron calostrotum is a species of flowering plant in the genus Rhododendron native to Tibet, south-central China, and Myanmar. Its putative subspecies Rhododendron calostrotum subsp. keleticum, called the beautiful-covering rhododendron, and its cultivar 'Gigha' have both gained the Royal Horticultural Society's Award of Garden Merit.

Supbspecies
The following subspecies are currently accepted:
Rhododendron calostrotum subsp. riparium (Kingdon-Ward) Cullen

References

calostrotum
Plants described in 1920